Port Wakefield Highway (and its southern section as Port Wakefield Road) is an important South Australian highway, connecting Adelaide to the Yorke Peninsula, Port Augusta, northern and western South Australia, the Northern Territory and Western Australia. It is designated National Highway A1 and a part of the National Highway. It is named after Port Wakefield, the first government town north of Adelaide.

Route
Port Wakefield Highway begins at the intersection of Augusta and Copper Coast Highways just north of Port Wakefield, and runs as a four-lane, dual-lane carriageway south to the interchange with the North–South Motorway and Northern Expressway; it changes name to Port Wakefield Road and continues south into Adelaide as a four-lane, dual-carriage road, widening to six lanes at Ryans Road in Parafield Gardens, narrowing back to four lanes at Cavan Road in Gepps Cross, and then ends at Main North Road a short distance later. The route is dual-carriageway for its entire length to Port Wakefield and bypasses all of the small towns along its former route.

History

The four-span bridge opened in 1926 over the Gawler railway line at Cavan was replaced with two dual carriageway bridges in 1980. At the same time Virginia and Two Wells were bypassed.

In 2011 an upgrade including road widening of nine kilometres of Port Wakefield Road between Salisbury Highway and Waterloo Corner Road was completed as part of the Northern Expressway project. Historically, the whole route was named Port Wakefield Road, however following the opening of the Northern Expressway, the route from Port Wakefield south to that junction in Waterloo Corner was renamed Port Wakefield Highway. 

In February 2020, the northbound ramp from Port Wakefield Road to the Northern Expressway was closed permanently as part of the final stages of opening the Northern Connector, the project name at the time for the northernmost part of the North–South Motorway. Northbound traffic to the Northern Expressway needs to use an earlier entrance to the North–South Motorway or join the Northern Expressway later via Waterloo Corner Road and Heaslip Road.

The original bypass of Port Wakefield has become built up with roadhouses and other businesses, leading to calls to build a new bypass further east; this has evolved into a duplication of the road through Port Wakefield, resulting in wider carriageways and a safer separation of traffic. The contract for detailed design and construction of duplication of the highway through Port Wakefield and a grade-separated intersection with the Copper Coast Highway was let in March 2020 to the Port Wakefield to Port Augusta Alliance (a consortium of CPB Contractors, Aurecon and GHD Group, also responsible for the duplication of Joy Baluch AM Bridge in Port Augusta), with the government announcing an overpass for the intersection with Copper Coast Highway in 2021. Project construction commenced in late 2020, with completion expected in 2022; the overpass to Copper Coast Highway opened in December 2021, four months ahead of schedule.

Major intersections

Towns

Port Wakefield Road passes through the northern Adelaide Plains. To the west of the road is the coastal fringe of upper Gulf St Vincent, including a number of fishing and holiday villages. To the east is rich cropping and farming land.

The list of towns on or near the road include:
 Virginia
 Two Wells
 Lower Light
 Dublin
 Windsor
 Wild Horse Plains
 Inkerman
 Port Wakefield

See also

 Highways in Australia
 List of highways in South Australia
 Highway 1 (Australia)
 Highway 1 (South Australia)
 Lower Light protest statues

References

Highways in Australia
Roads in Adelaide
Roads in South Australia
Freeways and highways in Adelaide
Highway 1 (Australia)